Susana Machado Bernard House and Barn is an elaborate  Art Nouveau Gothic Revival style mansion and carriage house located in the Pico Union section of Los Angeles, California. Built in 1901, the house was designed by architect John B. Parkinson (1861–1935).  Parkinson also designed the Los Angeles Memorial Coliseum, Union Station and Los Angeles City Hall. Noted for its Gothic style with soaring spaces, the house has vaulted ceilings and curved walls. In 1979, it was designated a Los Angeles Historic-Cultural Monument (HCM #208), and listed on the National Register of Historic Places. The property was purchased in 1996 by the Center for Human Rights & Constitutional Law. Since 2002, the house has been operated as the Casa Libre/Freedom House, a fourteen-bed shelter for homeless minors. In May 2003, the Los Angeles Times profiled the shelter, noting the following: "Casa Libre/Freedom House occupies a newly renovated mansion near MacArthur Park. Registered as a state, county and federal historic site, the home's gothic facade rises elegantly from the corner of South Lake Street and James M. Wood Boulevard. The shelter arranges for schooling, counseling, and medical care for undocumented and unaccompanied immigrant children, mainly from Latin America.

See also
 The Parkinsons
 National Register of Historic Places listings in Los Angeles
 List of Los Angeles Historic-Cultural Monuments in the Wilshire and Westlake areas

References

External links

Barns on the National Register of Historic Places in California
Houses completed in 1901
Houses on the National Register of Historic Places in Los Angeles
Los Angeles Historic-Cultural Monuments
Pico-Union, Los Angeles
John and Donald Parkinson buildings
Gothic Revival architecture in California
Victorian architecture in California
Art Nouveau architecture in California